Vriesea triangularis is a plant species in the genus Vriesea. This species is endemic to Brazil.

References

triangularis
Flora of Brazil